Tamer Hosny Sherif Abbas Farghaly (born 16 August 1977), known by his artistic name Tamer Hosny, is an Egyptian singer, actor, composer, director and songwriter. He first came to public attention when he appeared on mixed tapes with other Egyptian artists. Hosny launched his solo career with his 2004 album Hob, becoming a successful singer of romantic music and was given the nickname "King of the Generation" by his fans.

Life and career 
Tamer Hosny was born in Cairo to an Egyptian father and Syrian mother. Unlike his father, Hosny Sherif Abbas, Tamer Hosny grew up with an interest in football and played the sport for five years. Tamer Hosny had his first directorial experience in 2010 when directing his music video "Se7eet 3la Sotha" (Woke up to her voice). Hosny had a long-held ambition to become a director and to make his own music video. He starred in the 2003 Egyptian film Halet Hob (A State of Love). In 2006, he was arrested for forging military papers to avoid military conscription. He received a one-year prison sentence, yet he only stayed in jail for six months.

In 2010, he released the comedy-drama film The Light of My Eyes. The movie was placed first on the Arabian box office after a week of its release. 

In 2012, he released Omar & Salma 3, the third sequel to the Omar & Salma trilogy. Hosny has frequently stated that he was not satisfied with the film. In a recent interview on the Set El Hosn (Beautiful lady) program, he admitted that "I'm not happy with how the movie turned out, although many people love it and it was a box office success. I don't blame anyone else for that. I take responsibility for it. We had to make major plot changes due to financial reasons."

After three years away from the movie industry, he released Ahwak alongside Ghada Adel and Ahmed Malek, a romantic comedy about a young plastic surgeon who falls in love with a divorced woman. The film was a success at the box office, with total revenue of 22 million Egyptian pounds.

In 2017, Hosny released Tesbah ala Kher (Good Night), a comedy drama about a wealthy entrepreneur who suffers from depression and hallucinations. Falcon Films – the film distributor in the Arab world – released an official statement announcing that the movie has topped the Arabic box office.

In 2018, Hosny released a new comedy El-Badlah. In 2019, Hosny released a new thriller comedy El Feloos (The Money). It grossed more than EGP 46 million in the Egyptian box office in a little over a month, while it reaped almost USD 2 million worldwide. In December 2019, Hosny broke the Guinness World Record for the most contributions to a bulletin board.

In 2021, Hosny released his new comedy-drama Mesh Ana. The film is written by Hosny, directed by Sarah Wafik, and produced by Synergy and HS production.

Drama
During Ramadan 2011, Hosny starred in the television drama, Adam. Directed by Mohammad Samy, it also featured Dina Fouad, Ahmed Zaher and Mai Ezz Eldin. This series achieved big success and high views on YouTube and won the best series in 2011 in many votes. His next film Omar & Salma 3 was scheduled to release in November 2011 during the Eid al-Adha holiday.

Collaborations
During two years, Tamer Hosny had discovered more than 20 new talents in lyric writing and composing, over five new singers, more than ten new actors, and Mohamed Sami as a drama and cinema director (director of his series Adam).

Hosny sang vocals in Bokra "Tomorrow (A Better You, Better Me)", a charity single that was released on 11 November 2011, along with Rim Banna, Akon, Diana Karazon, Marwan Khoury, Latifa, Souad Massi, Hani Mitwasi, Saber Rebaï, Kathem Al-Saher, Waed, Sherine and other Arab Artists. Proceeds from the single were distributed to various organizations, institutions and charities with arts and culture programs. The eight-minute song was written by Majida El Roumi, and produced by Quincy Jones and RedOne.

Tamer Hosny recorded a new duet song with Shaggy, named "Smile". The song, written and composed by Tamer Hosny, was distributed all over the world. The music video was released at the beginning of 2012. It was shot in New York City and garnered more than one million views in only three days on YouTube.

In another collaboration, titled Si Al Sayed, after the patriarchal protagonist of the Cairo Trilogy, Snoop Dogg appeared in the music video wearing traditional Egyptian Jellabiya and having his name written in Arabic script.

Hosny performed "Right Where I'm Supposed to Be" as the Official Song of the 2019 Special Olympics World Summer Games in Abu Dhabi, the United Arab Emirates in collaboration with Ryan Tedder, Avril Lavigne, Luis Fonsi, Hussain Al Jassmi and Assala Nasri openly presented by public figure Hilal Al-Battashi.

Stage and live performances 

Because of Hosny's perceived charismatic stage presence and creativity, his fans dubbed him "King of the stage". In an interview with Sherihan Abu Al Hassan on her program Set El Hosn, Hosny said that he doesn't pay much attention to the titles given to him by fans, like "King of a generation". He appreciates the "King of the stage" title due to his efforts to improve his stage appearance in Egypt. "I'm no king, I'm not a fan of titles at all, I only appreciate the fact that my efforts to improve Egypt's stage appearance are acknowledged by the fans", he said, "My favorite title is just being called an Egyptian Arab artist when performing abroad."

Personal life 
Hosny married Star Academy contestant and Moroccan singer Bassma Boussel in 2012. They have two daughters and a son.

He is an endorser of the soft drink Pepsi. He was also the First Arab Celebrity to advertise the Police brand of sunglasses.

On 9 August 2017, Hosny made a temporary footprint ceremony at the TCL Chinese Theatre in Hollywood, California, being the first Egyptian/Arab artist to do so.

Discography

In addition to:
 Free Mix 2000 (2000)
 Free Mix 3 (2002)
 Free Mix 4 (2005)

Series
 "Adam" (2011)
 "Faraq Al-taweet" (2014)
 "My Way" (2015)
 "Weld El Ghalaba" (2020) Mahmoud Shalaby (Guest of Honor)

References

External links
 
 
 Ournia – Tamer Hosni

1977 births
20th-century Egyptian male singers
Egyptian singer-songwriters
Egyptian male film actors
Egyptian male television actors
Egyptian people of Syrian descent
21st-century Egyptian male singers
Singers from Cairo
Living people
Singers who perform in Egyptian Arabic
Singers who perform in Classical Arabic